Della Grazie Battery, also known as Xgħajra Battery, is an artillery battery in Xgħajra, Malta. It was built by the British between 1888 and 1893. The battery stands above the shore to the east of Grand Harbour, between Fort Saint Rocco and Fort Saint Leonardo. It is currently in a dilapidated state, and part of the battery is used as the town hall for Xgħajra.

History
Construction of the battery started in October 1888 and was completed in March 1893, at a cost of £16,344. It was constructed to take advantage of the improved breech loading guns then coming into service. It was equipped with two 6 inch and two 10 inch breech loading guns in disappearing mounts.

The installation takes the form of a polygonal fort, irregular hexagonal in plan, with two caponiers defending the forward ditches. Access to the fort is via a gatehouse and causeway across the rear ditch.

The battery takes its name from the much earlier Wignacourt tower, the Santa Maria delle Grazie Tower that stood close to the present battery. The tower was  demolished to clear the field of fire of the present battery.

The battery was abandoned in 1910 and its guns were removed. However, in World War II the battery was used as a coastal defence search light battery. At this time some structures were added to accommodate the searchlights.

Present day
The battery is now under the care of the Xgħajra Local Council. Part of the battery serves as the town hall for the locality, while the rest of the battery was partially restored in collaboration with Fondazzjoni Wirt Artna. It was planned that the battery will be opened to the public and form the focal point for a public space, Battery Park. The battery is currently in a dilapidated state, with most of its outer revetment walls having collapsed into the ditch.

In 2015, the battery was shortlisted as a possible site for the campus of the proposed American University of Malta. It was not chosen, and the campus is to be split up between Dock No. 1 in Cospicua and Żonqor Point in Marsaskala.

Gallery
The gallery below shows views on an anti-clockwise tour of the exterior of the fort. The rear section of the left hand ditch and the right half or the rear ditch are private property and inaccessible to photograph.

References

Further reading

Della Grazia Battery - 

British fortifications in Malta
Polygonal forts in Malta
Batteries in Malta
World War II sites in Malta
City and town halls in Malta
Military installations established in 1893
Limestone buildings in Malta
19th-century fortifications
Former towers
Buildings and structures in Xgħajra